The official 2012/2013 snooker world ranking points for the professional snooker players on the World Snooker Main Tour in the 2012–13 season were based on performances in ranking tournaments over a two-year rolling period. The total points from the 2010/2011 and 2011/2012 seasons set the rankings at the start of 2012/2013 season and were updated after every ranking tournament. As points were accrued from tournaments in the current season, the points from the corresponding tournaments from two seasons ago were dropped. The rankings set the official seedings at the start of the season and at four further points during the season. The total points accumulated by the cut-off dates for the revised seedings were based on all the points up to that date in the 2012/2013 season, all of the points from the 2011/2012 season, and the points from the 2010/2011 season that had not yet been dropped. The total points from the 2011/2012 and 2012/2013 seasons set the rankings at the start of the 2013/2014 season.

Seeding revisions

Ranking points 
{| class="wikitable sortable" style="text-align: center; font-size:90%;"
|-
! rowspan="2" scope=col class=unsortable | No.
! rowspan="2" scope=col width="35pt" class=unsortable |  Ch 
! rowspan="2" scope=col width="200pt" | Player
! colspan="2" class="unsortable"| Season
! colspan="11" class="unsortable"| Tournament
! class="unsortable"| Season
! colspan="4" class="unsortable"| Cut-off point
! rowspan="2" scope=col | Total
|-
! scope=col | 10/11
! scope=col | 11/12
! scope=col | PTC
! scope=col | WUC
! scope=col | AO
! scope=col | SM
! scope=col | IC
! scope=col | UK
! scope=col | GM
! scope=col | WEO
! scope=col | WOO
! scope=col | CO
! scope=col | WC
! scope=col | 12/13
! scope=col | 
! scope=col | 
! scope=col | 
! scope=col | 
|-

|}

Notes

References 

2012
Ranking points 2013
Ranking points 2012